Joseph or Joe Kaufman, Kauffman, Kauffmann, or Kaufmann could refer to: 

Joseph Kaufman (director) (1882-1918), American film director and actor
Joseph Kaufman (producer) (sometimes known as Joe Kaufmann, 1911-1961), American film producer
Joe Kaufman (politician), 2014 Republican candidate in Florida's 23rd congressional district
Joseph Kaufmann (actor) (1943-1973), lead actor in the 1973 film Heavy Traffic
Joseph Kauffman (politician), member of the Council of State of Luxembourg